South Milford railway station serves the villages of South Milford and Sherburn in Elmet in North Yorkshire, England.

History
The station was opened in 1834 as Milford railway station on the Leeds and Selby Railway. The name was changed to South Milford station in 1867, however, some early timetables refer to the station as Milford Bridge. The Leeds and Selby Railway was leased to George Hudson, which allowed him to divert all traffic via his line through . As such, between 1848 and 1850, no railway traffic moved west of Milford, and even by 1850, this was restarted as only local traffic.

Facilities at the station are limited – there are shelters on each platform and passenger information screens and ticket machines were installed in 2018 as part of a programme of station improvements by the operator. There is no footbridge or subway.

The station did have buildings and a signal box up until at least 1979 (the main building was one of the last remaining examples of original Leeds and Selby Railway architecture), but these were subsequently demolished.

Services

On Monday to Saturday daytimes, the station is served by a Northern hourly local service, which runs in each direction between Hull Paragon Interchange and Halifax via  and Bradford Interchange. This is an extension of the former Leeds to Selby local stopping service that called here prior to the winter 2019 timetable change.  A few additional trains operate at peak times.

On Sundays, there is also an hourly service each way but running between Selby and Leeds only.  

One Transpennine Express service in each direction calls here on Mondays-Saturdays.  One Transpennine Express service from Hull to Leeds will call here on Sunday evenings from 19 February 2023.

References

External links

Railway stations in North Yorkshire
DfT Category F1 stations
Railway stations in Great Britain opened in 1834
Railway stations in Great Britain closed in 1840
Railway stations in Great Britain opened in 1850
Railway stations served by TransPennine Express
Northern franchise railway stations
Former Leeds and Selby Railway stations
Sherburn in Elmet